Debub Achefer or South Acheref, is a woreda in Amhara Region, Ethiopia. It is named for the historic district of Achefer, which was first mentioned in the 16th century. Part of the Mirab Gojjam Zone, Achefer is bordered on the south and west by the Agew Awi Zone, on the north by Semien Acheref, and on the east by Mecha; the Lesser Abay River defines the woreda's eastern boundary. The administrative center is Durbete. Debub Acheref was part of former Acherfer woreda.the woreda is geographical platform also very wonder full for practicing Agriculture and animal's product. Especially maize cropping is almost critical production line. But there is limited road access to harvest animal production, due to it needs short period of time to reach the market !!

Demographics
Based on the 2007 national census conducted by the Central Statistical Agency of Ethiopia (CSA), this woreda has a total population of 136,508, of whom 69,239 are men and 67,269 women; 11,776 or 8.63% are urban inhabitants. The majority of the inhabitants practiced Ethiopian Orthodox Christianity, with 98.91% reporting that as their religion, while 1.01% were Muslim.

Notes

Districts of Amhara Region